Moses Odion (born 10 June 1972) is a Nigerian boxer. He competed in the men's lightweight event at the 1992 Summer Olympics.

References

External links
 

1972 births
Living people
Nigerian male boxers
Olympic boxers of Nigeria
Boxers at the 1992 Summer Olympics
Place of birth missing (living people)
Lightweight boxers